The Gilgit-Baltistan Assembly (GBA), formerly known as Gilgit-Baltistan Legislative Assembly (GBLA), is a unicameral legislature of elected representatives of Autonomous territory (de facto Pakistani province) of Gilgit-Baltistan, which is located in Jutial neighbourhood in the city of Gilgit, the capital of Gilgit-Baltistan. It was established under the Gilgit-Baltistan Empowerment and Self-Governance Order in 2009 which granted the region self-rule and an elected legislative assembly having a total of 33 seats, with 24 general seats, 6 seats reserved for women and 3 reserved for Technocrats and Professionals.

The third Gilgit-Baltistan Elections was held on 15 November 2020.

History 
The Gilgit-Baltistan Legislative Assembly was formed as a part of the Gilgit-Baltistan Empowerment and Self-Governance Order in 2009 which granted the region self-rule and an elected legislative assembly. The first Gilgit-Baltistan Assembly elections were held on 12 November 2009 which Pakistan Peoples Party won by 20 seats.

List of Assemblies

Speakers of Gilgit-Baltistan Assembly

Chief Ministers of Gilgit-Baltistan

List of Opposition Leaders

Elections

2009 Elections 
In the 2009 elections, Pakistan Peoples Party had won 20 seats, Jamiat Ulema-e-Islam (Fazl) with 4 and Pakistan Muslim League (Q) with 3 seats.

2015 Elections 
In the 2015 elections, Pakistan Muslim League (N) won 22 seats, Islami Tehreek Pakistan with 4 and Majlis Wahdat-e-Muslimeen with 3 seats.

2020 Elections

Incumbent members

See also
 Gilgit-Baltistan Council
 Government of Gilgit-Baltistan

References

Government of Gilgit-Baltistan
Provincial Assemblies of Pakistan